Aghbolagh-e Olya (also Romanized as Āghbolāgh-e ‘Olyā; also known as Āgh Bolāgh, Akbulāgh, Āq Bolāgh, Āqbolāgh-e ‘Olyā, and Aq Bulāq) is a village in Chaman Rural District, Takht-e Soleyman District, Takab County, West Azerbaijan Province, Iran. At the 2006 census, its population was 320, in 72 families.

References 

Populated places in Takab County